Milk vine is a common name for several plants and may refer to:

Marsdenia species:
Marsdenia rostrata, milk vine
Marsdenia flavescens, yellow milk vine, or hairy milk vine
Marsdenia fraseri, narrow-leaved milk vine
Marsdenia liisae, large-flowered milk vine
Matelea species